The athletics competition in the 1950 Central American and Caribbean Games were held in Guatemala City, Guatemala.

Medal summary

Men's events

Women's events

Medal table

References

 
 
 

Athletics at the Central American and Caribbean Games
Central American and Caribbean Games
International athletics competitions hosted by Guatemala
1950 Central American and Caribbean Games